Double Up is a Canadian quiz show television series which aired on CBC Television in 1974.

Premise
This quiz show drew comparisons to the American series You Bet Your Life. It was hosted by Hart Pomerantz, a panelist of CBC series This Is the Law which Double Up replaced between seasons.

In each episode, three pairs of contestants responded to quiz questions during the game. One of the pairs had an opportunity to double their cash prize towards the end of the show.

Scheduling
This half-hour series was broadcast on Mondays at 9:30 p.m. (Eastern) from 1 July to 2 September 1974, then for two final Saturday episodes at 6:30 p.m. on 28 September and 5 October 1974.

References

External links
 
 

CBC Television original programming
1970s Canadian game shows
1974 Canadian television series debuts
1974 Canadian television series endings